"We Take Mystery (To Bed)" is a song written and recorded by English new wave musician Gary Numan, the second single released from his fourth solo studio album, I, Assassin (1982). It peaked at No. 9 on the UK Singles Chart (the highest of three Top 20 hits from the album) and it remains Numan's last Top 10 hit.

The song was written about an ex-girlfriend of Numan's at the time called Debbie. According to his biography, she was at a club with her sister and it was inevitable that he would fancy one of them. Either would then charm him into getting romantically involved before selling their story about him to the press.

Track listing
7" single
 "We Take Mystery (To Bed)"
 "The Image Is"

12" single
 "We Take Mystery (To Bed)" (Extended)
 "The Image Is"
 "We Take Mystery (To Bed)" (Early Version)

12" US version
 "White Boys and Heroes" (Remix)
 "We Take Mystery (To Bed)" (Extended)

References

External links
 

1982 singles
Gary Numan songs
1982 songs
Songs written by Gary Numan